Sam Sherring (born 8 May 2000) is an English professional footballer who plays for Northampton Town, as a defender.

Career
Born in Dorchester, Sherring began his career with Bournemouth, in 2007, at the age of 7. After loan spells with Weymouth, and Torquay United, which included appearing in the National League Play-Off final, he moved on loan to Accrington Stanley in August 2021. On 11 January 2022, Sherring signed on loan for Cambridge United until the end of the season.

He moved to Northampton Town in July 2022.

Career statistics

References

2000 births
Living people
English footballers
AFC Bournemouth players
Weymouth F.C. players
Torquay United F.C. players
Accrington Stanley F.C. players
Cambridge United F.C. players
Northampton Town F.C. players
Association football defenders
National League (English football) players
English Football League players